ARM Cuauhtémoc is a sail training vessel of the Mexican Navy, named for the last Mexica Hueyi Tlatoani Cuauhtémoc who was captured and executed in 1525.

She is the last of four sister ships built by the naval shipyards of Bilbao, Spain, in 1982, all built to a design similar to the 1930 designs of the German firm Blohm & Voss, like Gorch Fock,  and the NRP Sagres.

Built at the Celaya Shipyards in Bilbao, she was designed by Naval Engineer Juan José Alonso Verástegui. Her keel was laid on July 24, 1981, and she was delivered to the Mexican Navy in Bilbao on July 29, 1982.

Her first commander was Captain Manuel Zermeño del Peón, in command of a crew of cadets from the Mexican Naval Academy who received the ship and brought Cuauhtémoc home to Mexico.

Crest
The body of the shield is made up of two concentric circles: the exterior, like a cord of abaca, suggests the ship's rigging, the tool necessary for the crew to raise and lower the sails. The inner circle serves to concentrically divide the total circumference of the body.

The internal part of these carries in its center the silhouette of Cuauhtémoc on its port side and with all the rigging, sailing to the west, driven by the wind, represents her first trip to Mexico from Spain.

In the ring formed by the two circles there are two inscriptions: reading Armada de México (Mexican Navy) on the top, and Buque Escuela Cuauhtémoc (Cuauhtémoc School Ship), on the bottom.

The same ring offers, at the eastern point, the figure of the wind god Ehécatl, who with his breath propels the ship to the west. At the setting point appears the Sun of the evening twilight; at the north point, interspersed in the inscription, the sidereal stars that make constant knowledge of their position possible. Finally, in the upper part of the body, the eagle of the Mexican Coat of Arms, which recalls the origin of the ship and its strength.

Cruises
• Atlantic Cruise 1982
• Oriente Cruise 1983
• Tahiti Cruise 1984
• North Atlantic Cruise 1985
• Liberty Cruise 1986
• South Pacific Cruise 1987
• Mediterranean Cruise 1988
• Eurocaribe Cruise 1989
• 1990 Circumnavigation Cruise
• 50th Anniversary Cruise of the Secretary of the Atlantic Navy 1992
• Cape Horn Cruise 1992-1993
• Cruise Europe 1994
• Canada Cruise 1994
• Baltic Cruise 1996
• Cruiser Osaka 1997
• Cruise Australia 1998
• Lisbon Cruise 1998
• 1999 North Sea Cruise
• Euroamerica 2000 Cruise
• Europe Cruise 2001
• 2002 Circumnavigation Cruise
• Rouen Cruise 2003
• Sail Rhode Island 2004
• 2005 North Pacific Training Cruise
• Circumnavigation Cruise 2006
• Baltic Instructional Cruise 2007
• Rouen Cruise 2008
• Japan Instructional Cruise 2009
• 2010 Bicentennial Sailing Instruction Cruise South America
• Mediterranean Cruise 2011
• Atlantic Cruise 2012
• Europe Cruise 2013
• Sail Latin America 2014
• Levante Mediterranean Cruise 2015
• Ibero Atlantic Cruise 2016
• Centennial Cruise of the 2017 Constitution
• Sail Latin America 2018

References
 American Sail Training Association; Sail Tall Ships! (American Sail Training Association; 16th edition, 2005 )

External links

Official Website of the Mexican Navy 
American Sail Training Association
Four slideshows with Cuauhtémoc from the Tall Ships' Races 2007 in Aarhus, Denmark by Thorsten Overgaard
The Cuauhtémoc at Hanse Sail 2007 in Warnemünde, Germany
Figurehead (close-up) of the Cuauhtémoc during docking in San Francisco July 2009
The Cuauhtémoc in Odessa, Ukraine August 2011
The Cuauhtémoc in San Diego, California, August 2014

Auxiliary ships of the Mexican Navy
Tall ships of Mexico
Ships built in Spain
1982 ships
Individual sailing vessels
Training ships of the Mexican Navy
Barques
Windjammers
Three-masted ships
Sail training ships